The 3rd Marine Littoral Regiment is a regiment of the United States Marine Corps that is optimized for littoral maneuver in the Indo-Pacific Theater. Based at Marine Corps Base Hawaii, the regiment falls under the command of the 3rd Marine Division and the III Marine Expeditionary Force. It was known as the 3rd Marine Regiment from 1914 to 2022, when it was renamed as part of the Commandant of the Marine Corps' Force Design 2030 initiative.

Current units
The regiment comprises one infantry battalion, one littoral anti-air battalion, one combat logistics battalion, one communications company, and one headquarters company.

 Communications Company
 Headquarters Company
 3rd Littoral Combat Team ( 1st Battalion, 3rd Marines )
 3rd Littoral Anti-Air Battalion
 3rd Littoral Logistics Battalion

History

Early years
The 3rd Marine Regiment was originally formed as part of the 1st Provisional Brigade, created in March 1911. A 3rd Regiment was formed on 14 March 1911 by consolidating Marine detachments from the various ships of the U.S. Atlantic Fleet then at anchor within Guantanamo Bay, Cuba. The regimental commander was Lieutenant Colonel Ben H. Fuller, who later became the 15th Commandant of the Marine Corps (1930-1934).

Until 17 June 1911, the 3rd Regiment was stationed at Camp Meyer, Deer Point, Guantanamo Bay. Companies E, F, and H reverted to their original assignments as ships' detachments on 10–11 June, while the rest of the regiment's letter companies did so on 17 June, at which time the 3rd Regiment was disbanded.

Another provisional regiment, tentatively designated as the 3rd, was formed on 21 April 1914 from Marine detachments of the ships that had converged on Vera Cruz. Assigned to support the activities of the 2nd Marine Regiment already ashore, the 3rd landed the same day it was formed. During the same period, another 3rd Regiment was assembled at the Philadelphia Navy Yard on 22 April 1914, under the command of Colonel Franklin J. Moses. It departed for Vera Cruz on board SS Morro Castle the next day.

With the arrival of Colonel Moses' 3rd Regiment at Vera Cruz on 30 April, all Marine units, except Major Catlin's command, were placed under the operational control of United States Expeditionary Forces, United States Army. Major Catlin's 3rd Regiment was disbanded the same date, with its personnel returning to their respective ships. During its stay in Mexico, Colonel Moses' command performed outpost and patrol duty and, at the same time, improved sanitary and living conditions within its sector.

Colonel Moses died of pneumonia on 26 September, six days after being evacuated to the hospital ship, . He was succeeded by Major John H. Russell, Jr., who later became the 16th Commandant of the Marine Corps (1934-1936). The 3rd Regiment left Vera Cruz on 23 November, arrived at the Philadelphia Navy Yard on 4 December, and was disbanded the following day.

The regiment was reactivated on 20 December 1916, from assets of the 1st Marine Regiment in the Dominican Republic. They were attached to the 2nd Brigade and deactivated on 1 August 1922.

World War II

The 3rd Marine Regiment was reactivated on 16 June 1942, at New River, North Carolina, as part of the World War II military expansion. They deployed to American Samoa on 14 September 1942, and were attached to the 2nd Marine Brigade. The regiment redeployed to New Zealand on 23 May 1943, and were reassigned to the 3rd Marine Division at that time. 

The regiment fought at Bougainville and Guam. Four Medals of Honor were awarded to members of 3rd Marines for actions during this period. Members of the unit were involved in the Agana race riot while stationed on Guam. During the Battle of Iwo Jima the 3rd Marines were kept in Reserve and were not sent ashore.

Following World War II, the regiment was ordered to China to aid in the disarming of Japanese units and to assist the Nationalist government in the occupation of Northern China in an effort to deny land to the communists.

Vietnam War

3rd Marines was one of the first Marine units into South Vietnam when it provided security for the Da Nang Air Base in early 1965. Ultimately, 3rd Marines participated in 48 major operations in the Republic of Vietnam.

The regiment departed South Vietnam in October 1969 and was initially relocated to Marine Corps Base Camp Pendleton, California and assigned to the 5th Marine Amphibious Brigade. During April 1971, the regiment became part of the 1st Marine Division. Two months later, the regiment was moved to Marine Corps Air Station Kaneohe Bay, Hawaii, to assume the role of the ground combat component of the 1st Marine Brigade.

1980s & 1990s

Task Force Taro
3rd Marines was one of the first combat forces to deploy to Saudi Arabia in response to the Iraqi invasion of Kuwait on 2 August 1990. The regiment, which became known as Task Force Taro in honor of the state and people of Hawaii, became the first American unit to be engaged by Iraqi artillery, rocket and missile fire on 18 January 1991. They countered the Iraqi supporting attacks by conducting artillery raids into Kuwait as the first ground offensive actions of the war. Task force Taro was instrumental in the recapture of Khafji, was the first unit to advance into Kuwait, conducted the only heliborne assault of the war and secured the Marine Corps' final objective of the war, Kuwait International Airport.

Following the cease-fire on 28 February 1991, the regiment redeployed to Saudi Arabia and subsequently completed its strategic redeployment to Hawaii two months later.

2000s
The 3rd Marines has deployed to both Iraq and Afghanistan as part of the Global War on Terror. One of their officers, Stephen J. Boada, was awarded the Silver Star for actions there. He became the first Marine in the regiment and from Hawaii to be awarded one of the major awards for valor since the Vietnam War. An NCO from 1st Battalion, 3rd Marines, Cpl Kristopher Kane, was later awarded a Silver Star for actions during the Second Battle of Fallujah.

The Regiment deployed to Afghanistan in late 2008 as Special Purpose Marine Air Ground Task Force - Afghanistan (SPMAGTF-A). They became Regimental Combat Team 3 during Operation Khanjar in Helmand Province. They returned to Helmand from late 2009 through May 2010, when it participated in Operation Moshtarak.

2020s
The Commandant announced a new program to forward deploy small maneuvering units called Marine Littoral Regiments to the South Pacific to counter China's aggressive policies in the region. The 3rd Regiment will be first to take part in the program. The Coast Guard could also be a potential partner in this program. On the 3 March 2022 the unit transitioned from 3rd Marine Regiment to 3rd Marine Littoral Regiment. This transition signaled a shift in the Marine Corps doctrine in the Pacific.

Unit awards
 Navy Unit Commendation, 3rd Marine Regiment(and all units attached to or serving with) on Bougainville
 Presidential Unit Citation, 3rd Marine Regiment(and all units attached to or serving with), Guam

See also

Organization of the United States Marine Corps
List of United States Marine Corps regiments

References

External links
3rd Marine Regiment's Official Website
Unit History

Infantry03
Military units and formations established in 1916
Infantry units and formations of the United States Marine Corps
Military units and formations of the United States in the Gulf War
1916 establishments in the United States